Zakaria Chihab (5 March 1926 – November 1984) was a Lebanese wrestler. At the 1952 Summer Olympics, he won the silver medal in the men's Greco-Roman Bantamweight category. He moved to Kuwait in the 1960s and died there in the 1980s.

References

External links
 
Mention of Zakaria Chihab's death 

1926 births
1984 deaths
Lebanese male sport wrestlers
Olympic wrestlers of Lebanon
Wrestlers at the 1952 Summer Olympics
Olympic silver medalists for Lebanon
Olympic medalists in wrestling
Medalists at the 1952 Summer Olympics
20th-century Lebanese people